E.T.D. Pop stands for Electro Techno Disco Popsicle. ETD Pop is an annual electronic music festival held at the Cow Palace in Daly City, California, U.S., a suburb of San Francisco. It is hosted by the Berkeley-based event promoters Skills.

It was first held in 1997. In 2008, ETD Pop featured Deep Voices, Markus Schulz, Ferry Corsten, Kaskade, Donald Glaude, DJ Dan, and Tiesto, and in 2009, Paul van Dyk, Ferry Corsten, Deadmau5, and Sander van Doorn. The line-up is usually announced at the earlier Skills event ETD Love.

ETD POP 2010 Lineup 
Armin Van Buuren
Infected Mushroom
Benny Benassi
Fedde le Grand
Boys Noize
Gareth Emery
Steve Aoki 
LA Riots
Deep Voices

Talent 
Artists who have performed at ETD Pop in previous years are listed below.

Armin Van Buuren
Above & Beyond
OceanLab
Lange
Markus Schulz
Sub Focus
Benny Benassi
Christopher Lawrence
Tiësto
Ferry Corsten
Deep Voices
Donald Glaude
DJ Dan
Kaskade
Infected Mushroom
Dieselboy
Paul van Dyk
Sander van Doorn
Deadmau5
Blix Cannon

See also

List of electronic music festivals
List of music festivals in the United States

References

External links

Music festivals established in 1997
Electronic music festivals in the United States